State Bank of India (SBI) is an Indian multinational public sector bank and financial services statutory body headquartered in Mumbai, Maharashtra. SBI is the 49th largest bank in the world by total assets and ranked 221st in the Fortune Global 500 list of the world's biggest corporations of 2020, being the only Indian bank on the list. It is a public sector bank and the largest bank in India with a 23% market share by assets and a 25% share of the total loan and deposits market. It is also the fifth largest employer in India with nearly 250,000 employees. On 14 September 2022, State Bank of India became the third lender (after HDFC Bank and ICICI Bank) and seventh Indian company to cross the  5-trillion  market capitalisation on the Indian stock exchanges for the first time.

The bank descends from the Bank of Calcutta, founded in 1806 via the Imperial Bank of India, making it the oldest commercial bank in the Indian subcontinent. The Bank of Madras merged into the other two presidency banks in British India, the Bank of Calcutta and the Bank of Bombay, to form the Imperial Bank of India, which in turn became the State Bank of India in 1955. Overall the bank has been formed from the merger and acquisition of more than twenty banks over the course of its 200 year history. The Government of India took control of the Imperial Bank of India in 1955, with Reserve Bank of India (India's central bank) taking a 60% stake, renaming it State Bank of India.

On 16th Aug 2022 an attempt to facilitate and support start-ups in the country, the State Bank of India (SBI) announced the launch of its first "state-of-the-art" dedicated branch for start-ups in the country in Bengaluru.

History 

The roots of State Bank of India lie in the first decade of the 19th century when the Bank of Calcutta later renamed the Bank of Bengal, was established on 2 June 1806. The Bank of Bengal was one of three Presidency banks, the other two being the Bank of Bombay (incorporated on 15 April 1840) and the Bank of Madras (incorporated on 1 July 1843). All three Presidency banks were incorporated as joint stock companies and were the result of royal charters. These three banks received the exclusive right to issue paper currency till 1861 when, with the Paper Currency Act, the right was taken over by the Government of India.  The Presidency banks amalgamated on 27 January 1921, and the re-organised banking entity took as its name Imperial Bank of India. The Imperial Bank of India remained a joint-stock company but without Government participation.

Pursuant to the provisions of the State Bank of India Act of 1955, the Reserve Bank of India, which is India's central bank, acquired a controlling interest in the Imperial Bank of India. On 1 July 1955, the Imperial Bank of India became the State Bank of India. In 2008, the Government of India acquired the Reserve Bank of India's stake in SBI so as to remove any conflict of interest because the RBI is the country's banking regulatory authority.

In 1959, the government passed the State Bank of India (Subsidiary Banks) Act. This made eight banks that had belonged to princely states into subsidiaries of SBI. This was at the time of the First Five Year Plan, which prioritised the development of rural India. The government integrated these banks into the State Bank of India system to expand its rural outreach. In 1963 SBI merged State Bank of Jaipur (est. 1943) and State Bank of Bikaner (est.1944).

SBI has acquired local banks in rescues. The first was the Bank of Bihar (est. 1911), which SBI acquired in 1969, together with its 28 branches. The next year SBI acquired National Bank of Lahore (est. 1942), which had 24 branches. Five years later, in 1975, SBI acquired Krishnaram Baldeo Bank, which had been established in 1916 in Gwalior State, under the patronage of Maharaja Madho Rao Scindia. The bank had been the Dukan Pichadi, a small moneylender, owned by the Maharaja. The new bank's first manager was Jall N. Broacha. In 1985, SBI acquired the Bank of Cochin in Kerala, which had 120 branches. SBI was the acquirer as its affiliate, the State Bank of Travancore, already had an extensive network in Kerala.

National Institute of Design, Ahmedabad designed the SBI logo in 1971.

There was, even before it actually happened, a proposal to merge all the associate banks into SBI to create a single very large bank and streamline operations.

The first step towards unification occurred on 13 August 2008 when State Bank of Saurashtra merged with SBI, reducing the number of associate state banks from seven to six. On 19 June 2009, the SBI board approved the absorption of State Bank of Indore, in which SBI held 98.3%. (Individuals who held the shares prior to its takeover by the government held the balance of 1.7%.)

The acquisition of State Bank of Indore added 470 branches to SBI's existing network of branches. Also, following the acquisition, SBI's total assets approached 10 trillion. The total assets of SBI and the State Bank of Indore were 9,981,190 million as of March 2009. The process of merging of State Bank of Indore was completed by April 2010, and the SBIndore branches started functioning as SBI branches on 26 August 2010.

On 7 October 2013, Arundhati Bhattacharya became the first woman to be appointed Chairperson of the bank. Mrs. Bhattacharya received an extension of two years of service to merge into SBI the five remaining associate banks.

Subsidiaries 
SBI provides a range of banking products through its network of branches in India and overseas, including products aimed at non-resident Indians (NRIs). SBI has 16 regional hubs and 57 zonal offices that are located at important cities throughout India.

Domestic 

SBI has over 24000 branches in India. Similarly, domestic operations contributed to 88.37% of total profits for the same financial year.

Under the Pradhan Mantri Jan Dhan Yojana of financial inclusion launched by Government in August 2014, SBI held 11,300 camps and opened over 3 million accounts by September, which included 2.1 million accounts in rural areas and 1.57 million accounts in urban areas.

International 
As of 2014–15, the bank had 191 overseas offices spread over 36 countries having the largest presence in foreign markets among Indian banks.

SBI Australia
SBI Bangladesh
SBI Bahrain
SBI Botswana
The SBI Botswana subsidiary was registered on the 27th January 2006 and was issued a banking licence by the Bank of Botswana on the 29th July 2013. The subsidiary handed over its banking licence and closed its operations in the country.

SBI Canada Bank  was incorporated in 1982 as a subsidiary of the State Bank of India. SBI Canada Bank is a Schedule II Canadian Bank listed under the Bank Act and is a member of Canada Deposit Insurance Corporation.
SBI China
SBI (Mauritius) Ltd SBI established an offshore bank in 1989, State Bank of India International (Mauritius) Ltd. This then amalgamated with The Indian Ocean International Bank (which had been doing retail banking in Mauritius since 1979) to form SBI (Mauritius) Ltd. Today, SBI (Mauritius) Ltd has 14 branches – 13 retail branches and 1 global business branch at Ebene in Mauritius.
Nepal SBI Bank Limited

In Nepal, SBI owns 55% of share. (The state-owned Employees Provident Fund of Nepal owns 15% and the general public owns the remaining 30%.) Nepal SBI Bank Limited has branches throughout the country.

SBI Sri Lanka now has three branches located in Colombo, Kandy and Jaffna. The Jaffna branch was opened on 9 September 2013. SBI Sri Lanka is the oldest bank in Sri Lanka; it was founded in 1864.

In Nigeria, SBI operates as INMB Bank. This bank began in 1981 as the Indo–Nigerian Merchant Bank and received permission in 2002 to commence retail banking. It now has five branches in Nigeria.

In Moscow, SBI owns 60% of Commercial Bank of India, with Canara Bank owning the rest. In Indonesia, it owns 76% of PT Bank Indo Monex. State Bank of India already has a branch in Shanghai and plans to open one in Tianjin.

In Kenya, State Bank of India owns 76% of Giro Commercial Bank, which it acquired for 8 million in October 2005.

SBI South Korea In January 2016, SBI opened its first branch in Seoul, South Korea.

SBI South Africa

SBI UK Ltd

SBI USA
In 1982, the bank established a subsidiary, State Bank of India, which now has ten branches—nine branches in the state of California and one in Washington, D.C. The 10th branch was opened in Fremont, California on 28 March 2011. The other eight branches in California are located in Los Angeles, Artesia, San Jose, Canoga Park, Fresno, San Diego, Tustin and Bakersfield.

Former Associate Banks 

SBI acquired the control of seven banks in 1960. They were the seven regional banks of former Indian princely states. They were renamed, prefixing them with 'State Bank of'. These seven banks were State Bank of Bikaner and Jaipur (SBBJ), State Bank of Hyderabad (SBH), State Bank of Indore (SBN), State Bank of Mysore (SBM), State Bank of Patiala (SBP),  State Bank of Saurashtra (SBS)  and State Bank of Travancore (SBT). All these banks were given the same logo as the parent bank, SBI. State Bank of India and all its associate banks used the same blue Keyhole logo said to have been inspired by Ahmedabad's Kankaria Lake. The State Bank of India wordmark usually had one standard typeface, but also utilised other typefaces. The wordmark now has the keyhole logo followed by "SBI".

The plans for making SBI a single very large bank by merging the associate banks started in 2008, and in September the same year, SBS merged with SBI. The very next year, State Bank of Indore (SBN) also merged.

Following a merger process, the merger of the 5 remaining associate banks, (viz. State Bank of Bikaner and Jaipur, State Bank of Hyderabad, State Bank of Mysore, State Bank of Patiala, State Bank of Travancore); and the Bharatiya Mahila Bank) with the SBI was given an in-principle approval  by the Union Cabinet on 15 June 2016. This came a month after the SBI board had, on 17 May 2016, cleared a proposal to merge its five associate banks and Bharatiya Mahila Bank with itself.

On 15 February 2017, the Union Cabinet approved the merger of five associate banks with SBI. An analyst foresaw an initial negative impact as a result of different pension liability provisions and accounting policies for bad loans. The merger went into effect from 1 April 2017.

Non-banking subsidiaries 
Apart from five of its associate banks (merged with SBI since 1 April 2017), SBI's non-banking subsidiaries include:
 SBI Capital Markets Ltd
 SBI Cards & Payments Services Pvt. Ltd. (SBICPSL)
 SBI Life Insurance Company Limited
SBI Mutual Fund
In March 2001, SBI (with 74% of the total capital), joined with BNP Paribas (with 26% of the remaining capital), to form a joint venture life insurance company named SBI Life Insurance company Ltd.

Other SBI service points 
As of 31 March 2017, the SBI group had 59,291 ATMs. Since November 2017, SBI also offers an integrated digital banking platform named YONO.

Yes Bank Investment 
State Bank of India acquired 48.2% of the shares of Yes Bank as part of RBI directed rescue deal in March 2020.

Listings and shareholding 
As on 31 March 2017, Government of India held around 61.23% equity shares in SBI. The Life Insurance Corporation of India, itself state-owned, is the largest non-promoter shareholder in the company with 8.82% shareholding.

The equity shares of SBI are listed on the Bombay Stock Exchange, where it is a constituent of the BSE SENSEX index, and the National Stock Exchange of India, where it is a constituent of the CNX Nifty. Its Global Depository Receipts (GDRs) are listed on the London Stock Exchange.

Employees 

SBI is one of the largest employers in the world with 245,652 employees as on 31 March 2021. Out of the total workforce, the representation of women employees is nearly 26%. The percentage of Officers, Associates and Subordinate staffs was 44.28%, 41.03% and 14.69% respectively on the same date. Each employee contributed a net profit of  during FY 2020–21.

See also 

 List of banks in India
 List of largest banks
 List of companies of India
 List of largest companies by revenue
 List of public corporations by market capitalisation
 List of Chairmen of the State Bank of India
 Make in India
 Forbes Global 2000
 Fortune India 500

References

External links 

 

 
Banks based in Mumbai
Banks established in 1955
BSE SENSEX
NIFTY 50
Multinational companies headquartered in India
Indian companies established in 1955
Public Sector Banks in India
1955 establishments in Bombay State
Companies listed on the National Stock Exchange of India
Companies listed on the Bombay Stock Exchange